Benjamin Masters (May 6, 1947 – January 11, 2023) was an American actor who is best known for his portrayal of Julian Crane in daytime drama Passions from July 8, 1999, to the show's final episode on August 7, 2008.

Early life
Masters was born in Corvallis, Oregon, and graduated from the University of Oregon as a theater major.

Career 
Masters moved to New York City and landed a role in the off-Broadway play The Boys in the Band. He also had a 13-month run in Kevin Wade's Key Exchange off-Broadway. The Broadway plays Captain Brassbound's Conversion with Ingrid Bergman and The Cherry Orchard with Irene Worth, Raul Julia, and Meryl Streep followed. Masters portrayed Nick, the older brother of the titular character in the 1976–1977 Saturday morning  series Muggsy.

Masters started in daytime dramas when he portrayed Vic Strang on Another World for three months in 1982.

Masters later appeared as corporate raider Linc Bartlett in the television miniseries Noble House in 1988.

On May 14, 1994, Masters was one of the guests in the Walker, Texas Ranger two-hour special episode titled "The Reunion".

In 1999, he signed a contract for NBC's Passions, as the womanizing billionaire Julian Crane. His role on the daytime drama landed him Soap Opera Digest Award nominations for Outstanding Supporting Actor in 2001 and 2002 and Outstanding Lead Actor in 2005. After NBC announced that it was cancelling Passions in February 2007, Masters said "I will miss getting to play this part so much. I had such a great time playing Julian Crane. I wanted to do it until I couldn't do it anymore."  Passions was later picked up by Directv for the 2007–2008 season.

Masters died from complications of COVID-19 while battling dementia on January 11, 2023, at the age of 75.

Filmography

References

External links
 

1947 births
2023 deaths
American male soap opera actors
American male film actors
American male television actors
Male actors from Oregon
People from Corvallis, Oregon
Deaths from the COVID-19 pandemic in California
Corvallis High School (Oregon) alumni
University of Oregon alumni